Mespil can refer to:

 Mespil road in Dublin City, Ireland, part of the R111 road
 The tree Manilkara zapota, also called Sapodilla
 The Snowy Mespil tree, Amelanchier lamarckii
 Mispil

See also
 Mespilus, a genus of trees